Wierzchownia  is a village in the administrative district of Gmina Górzno, within Brodnica County in Kuyavian-Pomeranian Voivodeship, in northern Poland.

Polish athlete Stanisława Walasiewicz was born here.

References

Villages in Brodnica County